Inters Gui (born 8 August 1992), simply known as Gui, is an Ivorian footballer who plays as a winger in Sporting Covilhã.

Career
After 4 years at Sporting Covilhã, amassing 70 caps, in July 2014, Gui joined Vitória Guimarães.

References

External links

1993 births
Living people
People from Bingerville
Association football wingers
Ivorian footballers
Ivorian expatriate footballers
Primeira Liga players
Liga Portugal 2 players
S.C. Covilhã players
Vitória S.C. players
Vitória S.C. B players
Associação Académica de Coimbra – O.A.F. players
FC Chiasso players
FC Samtredia players
FC Saburtalo Tbilisi players
Ivorian expatriate sportspeople in Portugal
Ivorian expatriate sportspeople in Switzerland
Expatriate footballers in Portugal
Expatriate footballers in Switzerland
Expatriate footballers in Georgia (country)